Arri is an administrative ward in the Babati Rural District of the Manyara Region of Tanzania.

According to the 2012 census, the ward has a population of 14,146.

References

Babati District
Wards of Manyara Region